Ramadi is a city in Iraq.

Ramadi may also refer to:
Battle of Ramadi (disambiguation)
Ramadi FC, a football club based in Ramadi 
Ramadi District in Iraq
Ramadi Barrage, a two-section dam near Ramadi, Iraq
Al Ramadi Stadium, a stadium in Ramadi, Iraq
Lazy Ramadi, a spoof video
Al-Ramadi, Deir ez-Zor Governorate, a Syrian town

See also
Ramati
Rahmati